Coronidium boormanii is a perennial herbaceous shrub in the family Asteraceae found in Australia. Previously known as Helichrysum boormanii, it was given its new name in 2008.

References

boormanii
Garden plants
Taxa named by Paul G. Wilson